Crow Canyon may refer to:
 Crow Canyon Archaeological Center, a teaching and research center located in southwestern Colorado, USA.
 Crow Canyon Archaeological District, a historic site in Rio Arriba County, New Mexico.